The Duke Ellington School of the Arts (established 1974) is a high school located at 35th Street and R Street, Northwest, Washington, D.C., and dedicated to arts education.  One of the high schools of the District of Columbia Public School system, it is named for the American jazz bandleader and composer Edward Kennedy "Duke" Ellington (1899–1974), himself a native of Washington, D.C.  The building formerly housed Western High School. The building is listed on the National Register of Historic Places.

Graduates of the school are prepared to pursue an artistic and theatric occupation.  In addition to completing the traditional public school college prep curriculum, students must audition for and complete studies in one of the following artistic areas: dance, literary media and communications, museum studies, instrumental music, vocal music, theater, technical design and production, and visual arts.

The school developed from the collaborative efforts of Peggy Cooper Cafritz, a long-time member of the D.C. School Board and Mike Malone, a veteran of Broadway, off-Broadway, contemporary dancer, director, and master choreographer, who were co-founders of Workshops for Careers in the Arts in 1968.  In 1974 this workshop program developed into the Duke Ellington School of the Arts at Western High School, an accredited four-year public high school program combining arts and academics. It is currently operated as a joint partnership between D.C. Public Schools, the Kennedy Center, and George Washington University.

Students and faculty
Ellington currently serves approximately 500 students in grades 9-12. Most students commute in from outside of Ward 2, where the school is situated. The academic faculty is fully credentialed and includes seven Fulbright scholars, various PhDs, and DCPS's only national board certified teacher (NBCT) in young adulthood English/language arts. Many of the arts faculty are alumni of the school.

Academics
Ranked as one of D.C. Public Schools' top high schools, Ellington's curriculum requires students earn 34% more credits than those at other D.C. public high schools. Students must maintain a minimum grade point average in both academics and the arts to be permitted to perform and, ultimately, to stay enrolled at Ellington. The school has a 99% on-time graduation rate.

Arts
Ellington's mission is to emphasize the arts as much as academics.  It offers training in eight disciplines: Dance, Literary Media and Communications, Museum Studies, Instrumental or Vocal Music, Theater, Technical Design and Production, and Visual Arts.

In support of their arts program, the school offers master classes taught by accomplished artists such as Wynton Marsalis, Billy Taylor, Lynn Whitfield, and Lionel Hampton.

The school is recognized for, among other things, its award-winning Duke Ellington Show Choir. Founded by Samuel L. E. Bonds Sr. in 1986, the Choir performs all types of music including Broadway, Gospel, Spirituals, Opera, Jazz, and R&B. Samuel L. E. Bonds Sr., who retired from the school in 2018, studied with Todd Duncan and still teaches private lessons. Students in the Choir are required to continue performing academically, maintaining a minimum grade point average of 3.0. As well as performing as part of an ensemble, they are also allowed to focus on solo work. It performs a holiday show of Amahl and the Night Visitors yearly.

Application process
In order to be admitted into Ellington, students must complete an admissions application and audition before a panel.  Upon passing the audition students take an academic assessment test, and complete a family interview.

Relocation controversy
In January 2010, The Washington Post reported that the D.C. government was studying a plan to relocate the school to a new site near Union Station. Jack Evans, the D.C. Council member for the school's host ward, advocates the plan as a way to move the school to a more "central" location relative to its student body, as well to allow the current Ellington site to revert to a standard neighborhood school. Opposition from students, parents, alumni, and others has been strong, including online petitions and a Facebook group with over 1,700 members. Shortly after The Washington Post report, D.C. Schools Chancellor Michelle Rhee announced that the school will not be moved in the near future.

Renovation
In 2017, a three-year renovation of the school was completed. The improvements cost $178.5 million, more than $100 million more than projected. The project became an example of the district's failure to prevent cost overruns.

Notable alumni 
Western High School
 Ruth Chew, author
 Barbara J. Fields, historian
 Ernest W. Gibson III, Associate Justice of the Vermont Supreme Court
 Solange Hertz, Catholic author
 George Van Horn Moseley Jr. United States Army officer who served in World War II
 Thomas A. Rymer (1925–2016), Maryland state delegate and judge
 John Whelchel, United States Navy vice admiral and football coach

Duke Ellington School for the Arts
 Dave Chappelle, comedian
Michaela Angela Davis, Essence magazine Executive Fashion & Beauty Editor, writer, author, commentator, and speaker
Matthew Dickens, actor/singer/dancer and writer/producer/director
Johnny Gill, R&B singer
 Denyce Graves, opera singer
 Corey Hawkins, Actor, opera singer
Tracy Inman, dancer with Alvin Ailey American Dance Theater and co-director of The Ailey School
 Simbi Khali, actress
Ari Lennox, singer
 Meshell Ndegeocello, bassist, singer
 Serena Reeder, Actress
 Wallace Roney, jazz trumpeter
 Gregory Charles Royal, jazz trombonist, playwright
 Lamman Rucker, actor
Adam Serwer, journalist and author
 Tony Terry, singer
 Mary Timony, musician
 Marja Vallila, sculptor 
 Samira Wiley, Actress

See also
 Duke Ellington

References

External links

 
 D.C. Public Schools

Public high schools in Washington, D.C.
Art schools in Washington, D.C.
Schools of the performing arts in the United States
District of Columbia Public Schools
Duke Ellington
Educational institutions established in 1974
Neoclassical architecture in Washington, D.C.
School buildings on the National Register of Historic Places in Washington, D.C.
Magnet schools in Washington, D.C.